The Cotonou Central Mosque is a mosque in Cotonou, Littoral, Benin. It is the most important building for the country's Muslims.

See also
 Religion in Benin

References

Mosques in Benin
Buildings and structures in Cotonou